Miyagi earthquake may refer to:

 1936 Miyagi earthquake
 1978 Miyagi earthquake
 2003 Miyagi earthquakes
 2005 Miyagi earthquake
2011 Tōhoku earthquake
 April 2011 Miyagi earthquake
 March 2021 Miyagi earthquake

See also 
 2008 Iwate–Miyagi Nairiku earthquake
 Fukushima earthquake (disambiguation)